The third season of the NBC comedy-drama series Parenthood premiered on September 13, 2011 and ended on February 28, 2012. This season consisted of 18 episodes.

Cast

Main cast 
 Peter Krause as Adam Braverman
 Lauren Graham as Sarah Braverman
 Dax Shepard as Crosby Braverman
 Monica Potter as Kristina Braverman
 Erika Christensen as Julia Braverman-Graham
 Sam Jaeger as Joel Graham
 Savannah Paige Rae as Sydney Graham (16 episodes)
 Sarah Ramos as Haddie Braverman (16 episodes)
 Max Burkholder as Max Braverman (15 episodes)
 Joy Bryant as Jasmine Trussell (15 episodes)
 Tyree Brown as Jabbar Trussell (15 episodes)
 Miles Heizer as Drew Holt (13 episodes)
 Mae Whitman as Amber Holt
 Bonnie Bedelia as Camille Braverman (14 episodes)
 Craig T. Nelson as Zeek Braverman (15 episodes)

Recurring cast 
 Jason Ritter as Mark Cyr
 Michael B. Jordan as Alex
 Skyler Day as Amy Ellis
 John Corbett as Seth Holt
 D. B. Woodside as Dr. Joseph Prestridge
 Alexandra Daddario as Rachel
 Rosa Salazar as Zoe DeHaven
 Courtney Ford as Lily
 Tom Maden as Zach Bell
 Amanda Foreman as Suze Lessing
 Tina Lifford as Renee Trussell
 Jonathan Tucker as Bob Little

Production 
Parenthood was renewed for a third season by NBC on May 12, 2011. This season of Parenthood was set to only have 16 episodes. However, on September 29, 2011, NBC ordered two more episodes of Parenthood bringing this seasons total to 18 episodes.

Episodes

Ratings

U.S. Live Ratings

References 

2011 American television seasons
2012 American television seasons
Season 3